The Act Number 44 of 2008 on Pornography, commonly known as Pornography Law (Undang-Undang Pornografi), is a law in Indonesia on pornography which was passed on 30 October 2008. It was proposed as the Bill against Pornography and Porno-Action, sometimes translated as Bill against Pornography and Pornographic Acts, by the Indonesian legislative assembly, Dewan Perwakilan Rakyat, on 14 February 2006. The bill was passed into an act on 30 October 2008.

A similar bill was discussed and unsuccessfully presented in the 1990s but was withdrawn in the face of opposition.

The 2005-06 bill attracted extensive opposition and was dropped, only to be reintroduced in 2008 as the Bill on Pornography. The bill states that anyone engaging in pornography and pornoaction is punishable by law, pornoaction being an invented word that means "actions deemed indecent." This includes, but is not limited to, public acts such as spouses kissing, women showing their navels or shoulders, and people sunbathing in bikinis or swimwear.

This bill provoked a severe negative reaction from many people who believed that the government is trying to limit their freedom. Several public demonstrations ensued both by people who supported (the Prosperous Justice Party (PKS) and Muslim religious leaders) and those who rejected the bill as too broad-ranging and a restriction on personal freedom.

In 2010 the anti-pornography law was challenged but Indonesia's Constitutional Court upheld the ban and stated that the law's definition of pornography was clear and did not violate the constitution.

See also
 Pornography laws by region
 Legality of child pornography
 Legal status of internet pornography
 Internet censorship in Indonesia

References

External links
  The bill on pornography and pornoaction in Indonesian
  Law No. 44 of 2008 on Pornography (official document of the DPR-RI)
 AsiaMedia article
 The Economist
 "Indonesia's New Anti-Porn Agenda". Time. 6 November 2008.
 The Guardian

Law of Indonesia
Indonesian pornography
Society of Indonesia
Pornography law